Zeta Psi is a collegiate fraternity. It was founded on June 1, 1847, at New York University. The organization now comprises fifty-three active chapters and thirty-four inactive chapters, encompassing roughly fifty thousand members, and is a founding member of the North American Interfraternity Conference.

One of the world's oldest collegiate fraternities, Zeta Psi has historically been selective about the campuses at which it has established chapters. The chapter at the University of California, Berkeley (June 10, 1870) made Zeta Psi the first fraternity in the U.S. west of the Mississippi. Its chapter at the University of Toronto, (March 27, 1879) was the first in Canada. The founding of the Eta chapter at Yale University (1889) briefly made it the only fraternity to have chapters at all eight Ivy League schools. The fraternity became intercontinental on May 3, 2008, with the chartering of Iota Omicron at the University of Oxford, and then with the chartering of Theta Omicron at Trinity College Dublin in 2012. Its newest such chapter, Psi Omicron at the University of Paris, joined on May 18, 2019.

The motto is "ΤΚΦ" in Greek, rendered in English as "Tau Kappa Phi", "TKP", or "TKPhi".

Zeta Psi's headquarters is located in Pearl River, New York.

History

1847 to 1860: Foundation and early expansion 

On June 1, 1847, three students at New York University, John Bradt Yates Sommers, William Henry Dayton and John Moon Skillman, formed a new Greek-letter society in a New York City bungalow. The three men formed the core of the first chapter, Phi. But William Dayton was stricken with poor health, and left New York shortly afterward for the University of North Carolina at Chapel Hill. Dayton died within the year.

The Phi chapter at NYU persisted in his absence, and graduated its first member the next year with George S Woodhull (Φ '48). The second chapter was established as Zeta at Williams College in Massachusetts. The Delta chapter was founded at Rutgers University later that year, and was the most continuously active chapter of the fraternity until it became inactive in 2009.

Three chapters followed in 1850: Omicron (now Omicron Epsilon) at Princeton University, Sigma at the University of Pennsylvania, and Chi at Colby College in Waterville, Maine. The first two are still active, as was the Chi chapter until 1988. In the early 1980s Colby College prohibited fraternities on campus, despite the long and storied tradition they had enjoyed there. By 1988, ejected from campus and banned from any formal rush, the chapter quietly expired after over 130 years of existence. Problems beset other early chapters as well. The first Alpha chapter was founded in 1852 at Dickinson College in Carlisle, Pennsylvania. But members met resistance from the administration and the chapter became inactive in 1872, permitting its letter to be used for the later chapter founded at Columbia.

1860 to 1864: The Civil War 

Abraham Lincoln was elected president of the United States in 1860, and South Carolina seceded from the Union, followed shortly thereafter by other Southern states. Expansion of the fraternity halted as campuses rallied for war and sent companies of soldiers to battle.

At the outbreak of war, the Upsilon chapter at UNC—only chartered three years before—found itself the only chapter of Zeta Psi among all the Southern states, sundered from the North by the sudden lines of enmity. But even as they mustered for war and marched south, the Grand Chapter of Zeta Psi, specially assembled in early July 1862, adopted the resolution of Brother William Cooke (Φ '58) prescribing unity:

 RESOLVED, That while we may differ in political sentiment with those of our Brothers who are courageously battling for principles which they deem right, no disaster shall separate them from the union of Tau Kappa Phi.

And the brothers of Upsilon replied by letter in like fashion:

 WHEREAS, The present distracted state of our country renders it inexpedient to hold our convention in this State during this year;

 RESOLVED, That the Sigma Alpha be instructed to write to all Chapters, assuring them that though our Federal Union has been dissolved, still the Circle of Zeta Psi Fraternity shall never be broken;

 RESOLVED, That the bonds of Tau Kappa Phi which bind us to our Brothers in the North are as strong as they ever were.

The tale of Brother Henry Schwerin (Θ '63) illustrates the embodiment of love even in the most trying of circumstance. Schwerin lay gravely wounded after the bloody Battle of Chattanooga; pinned on the breast of his Union uniform was the badge of Zeta Psi. A passing Confederate soldier, also a Zete, spied the badge and carried the invalid to medical care and safety, ignoring even the imperatives of war for the sake of his brother. The worthy badge later passed into the hands of his brother, Max Schwerin (Θ '70), who would one day serve as international president. After his death, it was donated by his sister to the Fraternity's archives and remains among its treasures. Brother John Day Smith (Ε '72) witnessed the incident on the Chattanooga field, and later related it to Brother Francis Lawton (Ε '69), who would author the poem "The Badge of Zeta Psi," later set to original music and preserved to this day. The reference to "Chattanooga's bloody field" is not idle hyperbole, but the recollection of a rare triumph among such sorrows.

And amid this sorrow and heroism where so many brothers of Zeta Psi perished, so too were even whole chapters swallowed by the War. The Eta (Gettysburg, Pennsylvania, chartered 1861), Psi Epsilon (Dartmouth), Upsilon (UNC), Epsilon (Brown), and Theta (Union) chapters had vanished by the end of the conflict, decimated by fallen brothers or disheartened campuses returning from the shadow of death. The Theta and Eta chapters would never survive the staggering losses they suffered, though the others ultimately recovered and reactivated. And the Gamma chapter—chartered 1861 at the Georgia Military Institute, the only new chapter during the War—was annihilated utterly by General Sherman's march, and existed thus only for those few years of tumult. But out of the shadow of war came regrowth and a time for Zeta Psi to expand once more.

1864 to 1914: Breaking new ground 

The nation was still young indeed even after the end of the Civil War: California had only recently become a State, committing to the side of the victorious Union and contributing its men though the conflict took place mainly across the continent, thousands of miles away. It was then only fitting that to California the Fraternities should next have moved. Pioneers in many initiatives, Zeta Psi was the first fraternity west of the Mississippi river and hence also the first to establish a chapter on the West Coast: in 1870 it established the Iota chapter at the University of California, Berkeley. (Though the Iota chapter would not be joined until 1892 by the next Western addition, the Mu chapter at Stanford University).

Nor was Zeta Psi content even to remain a national Fraternity, but also pressed northward into Canada. The brothers of the Xi chapter at the University of Michigan in 1879 constituted the Theta Xi chapter at the University of Toronto, to make Zeta Psi the first international Fraternity. Since then, Zeta Psi has actively bolstered its Canadian presence, commissioning a director solely for Canadian chapter development and amassing a long list of successful chapters there.

The end of the nineteenth century was fecund ground for Zeta Psi. It took root at no fewer than fourteen colleges in those latter days: Omega was founded at University of Chicago in 1864; Pi at Rensselaer Polytechnic Institute in 1865; Lambda at Bowdoin College, 1867; Beta at University of Virginia, 1868; Psi at Cornell University, 1868; Iota at UC Berkeley, 1870; Gamma, first at the US Naval Academy in 1874, and then at Syracuse College in 1875 after the government proscribed Fraternities at its military academies; Theta Xi at University of Toronto, 1879; Alpha at Columbia University, 1879; Alpha Psi at McGill University, 1883; Nu at Case Western Reserve, 1884; Eta at Yale, 1889; Mu at Stanford, 1892; Alpha Beta at University of Minnesota, 1899. The establishment of the Eta chapter at Yale had the result that Zeta Psi was the only fraternity to establish chapters at all eight Ivy-League schools.

Even as the physical reach of Zeta Psi made great bounds, so too did the principles underlying its brotherhood. By the turn of the century, the need for some more centralized structure pressed as chapter after chapter was added to the Circle and their correspondence became too much to handle so chaotically. In 1909, an international publication concerning the affairs of Zetes was first published by Brother William Comstock (Ξ '99) and distributed among the several chapters: The Circle of Zeta Psi. The periodical, which is still published to this day, contained in that first issue the exhortation which has come to be known as "The Vision of Bill Comstock" for its prescience and wisdom:

 We feel that the Fraternity, now that its individual chapters and memberships have grown so strong, is wasting its greatest possibility of strength and growth through the lack of a systematic central organization.

In short, Brother Comstock criticized the degree of individualism among the chapters of Zeta Psi, demanding unity among such disparate brothers. He prescribed that every member should receive the fledgling Circle of Zeta Psi, and thus be apprised of the far-flung doings of the fraternity; that a general secretary be commissioned to travel among the chapters and treat with them; and that a foundation be established for the pecuniary support of the general Fraternity. And all three of his mandates have been amply fulfilled: The Circle is still published and distributed to the brothers of Zeta Psi (and can be read online here); now the General Secretary is assisted in his rounds by chapter consultants, whose function remains the same; and the Zeta Psi Educational Foundation was to be instituted within Brother Comstock's lifetime, though still in the future. Before Zeta Psi could turn to such collegiate concerns, war again threatened, this time abroad.

1914 to 1920: The First World War 

Though already inured to the horrors and trial that War would wreak upon her from the bloody Civil War, war in Europe came suddenly in the 1910s and caught a nation and Fraternity unawares. For some time, the United States did not commit troops to the battle, maintaining an isolationist stance protected. But Canada was a Dominion within Britain's Commonwealth, and when Great Britain entered the war, Canada willingly answered the call.

With the first Canadian chapter only founded at Toronto in 1879, her sister chapters were still young when war came to them. Particularly stricken were the Alpha Psi and Theta Xi chapters at McGill and U Toronto. Even in 1914, they were already sending letters indicating their brothers were heading east across the sea to the war. In 1915, more than half the workers at the McGill Base Hospital were Zetes from Alpha Psi. By war's end, the two beleaguered chapters had sent two hundred of the brothers in defense of King and Country; 31 were never to return and many others came home wounded in body and spirit.

Perhaps most noted among the rolls of the brave Canadian brethren who went overseas is Lt. Col. Brother Dr. John McCrae (Θ Ξ '94), a serviceman in the Canadian army, who like so many other men did not return at the close of conflict. But Brother McCrae bequeathed to his fraternity more than even his worthy life, but also a poem which has been preserved in great honor as both a historical and literary work: "In Flanders Fields." The words are a testament to the heroic spirit in man and are treasured still by the brethren of Zeta Psi as the hallowed words of a brother whose time long ago passed.  The 19-year-old engineering student from McGill, brother Frederick Fisher was the first Canadian to win the Victoria Cross in the war, the highest British award for valour, for his determined stand at the Second Battle of Ypres.  Like so many who win this medal, the award was posthumous.

Finally in 1917, America entered the war, and with their country, so too did the many Zetes who called that land their home. At the annual convention of Zeta Psi, the brothers adopted a resolution in support of the war—which the United States Congress had itself only declared a few weeks previously—:

 WHEREAS, The United States of America has been forced into the World War in defense of its national honor and for the protection of international justice and democracy;

 BE IT RESOLVED, That the Zeta Psi Fraternity of North America, at the Seventieth Annual Convention assembled at Raleigh, North Carolina, hereby pledges to the President and Congress of the United States of America its unqualified support of whatever war measures the Government may deem necessary and expedient, and places at the disposal of the Government its national organization, its Chapters, and its individual members, for service in whatever capacities the government may direct.

Nor was the pledge mere idle words nor fatuous boasting. Over one-quarter of all brethren of Zeta Psi would serve during the First World War in foreign lands, and many did not return. Zeta Psi also provided the nation its first Assistant Secretary of War, Brother Benedict Crowell (Η '91), noted for his bold reorganization of civilian military control during World War I. Even after the war, Crowell remained politically powerful, and was later instrumental in engineering the repeal of National Prohibition.

Regalia and symbols

Colors 

The official color of the fraternity is white, the unofficial secondary colors are black and gold.

Flower 

The fraternity flower is the white carnation.

Flag 

The flag of the Zeta Psi is a white field with the letters Zeta and Psi or the words Zeta Psi written in the center in gold, piped in black.

Pledge Pin 

The Zeta Psi pledge pin is a white circle with a narrow gold outline.

Badge 

The badge of Zeta Psi consists of "a gold pin formed of the Greek letters Zeta and Psi and there shall be engraved upon it the letters O and A." The arms of the psi are also engraved, with a Roman fasces upon the right and a star upon the left. The badge is set with seven stones (usually pearl or jet) along each of the bars of the zeta, for a total of twenty-one.>

Patron Saints 

Each chapter of Zeta Psi chooses at its founding a patron saint to represent the chapter. There is no particular criteria for a chapter patron saint, other than the chosen figure must have some historical significance either to the chapter or the chapter's respective locality. The patron saints are as follows:

Literature

Directory of the Zeta Psi Fraternity 

First published in 1859, with two later editions in 1867 and 1883, the Catalogue of the Zeta Psi Fraternity contained names of members of the Fraternity arranged by chapters and years of initiation. In 1874, the Addenda to the Catalogue of the Zeta Psi Fraternity 1867-1874 was published to complement the 1867 edition of the Catalogue of the Zeta Psi Fraternity. In 1888, the title was changed to the Directory of the Zeta Psi Fraternity and contact information was added for members of the Fraternity. Later editions of The Directory were produced in 1889, 1893, 1910, 1912, 1913, 1916, 1922, 1926, 1932, 1953, 1987, 1992, and 1998. The Semicentennial Biographical Catalogue of the Zeta Psi Fraternity of North America was published in 1899. This volume contained biographies of over 4000 members of Zeta Psi from 1847 to 1900 and historical information about each chapter. The Directory continues to be published on a regular basis and the modern version is a useful networking tool for members of the Zeta Psi Fraternity.

Songs of the Zeta Psi Fraternity 

First published in 1871, by undergraduate members of the Psi chapter at Cornell University, Songs of the Zeta Psi Fraternity contains a collection of songs about the Zeta Psi Fraternity. Later editions appeared in 1890, 1897, 1903, 1914, and 1958. The Chapter, a brief compilation of poems, was also written by members of the Zeta Psi Fraternity in 1869.

The Jubilee of the Zeta Psi Fraternity of North America 

Published in 1903, The Jubilee of the Zeta Psi Fraternity of North America is a record of the fiftieth anniversary of the Zeta Psi Fraternity. Likewise, The Double Diamond Jubilee of the Zeta Psi Fraternity of North America published in 1997 was an account of the one hundred and fiftieth anniversary of the Zeta Psi Fraternity, made to complement The Story of Zeta Psi. Both volumes include historical information on the fraternity and its chapters.

The Circle 

First published in June 1909, The Circle is the annual publication of the fraternity. The corresponding secretary has the duty of filing a report for The Circle every year. The Circle was preceded by other periodic publications that were unsuccessful. These publications were "The Zeta Psi Monthly" published in 1883; "The Zeta Psi Quarterly" published from 1884 to 1886; and "The Bulletin of the Zeta Psi Fraternity of North America" first published in 1897.

The Story of Zeta Psi 

Published in 1928, with two later editions, The Story of Zeta Psi contains the detailed history of the fraternity and each chapter founded up to the point of publication.

Pledge Manual of the Zeta Psi Fraternity of North America 

The first published in 1942, the Pledge Manual of the Zeta Psi Fraternity of North America remains in publication and is a crucial source of information for men pledging the Zeta Psi Fraternity.

Famous members

Chapters 

Zeta Psi, like all conventional university fraternities, operates as chapters at various campuses across North America and the world. Zeta Psi has chapters in five countries:  Canada, the United States, England, Ireland, and France. Its chapter in Scotland is dormant.

Active chapters 

The active chapter is the core of the Zeta Psi experience.

Chapter governance 

Zeta Psi is modeled after most modern democracies in that they have legislative, judicial, and executive branches of governance.

Chapter meeting 

Each chapter meeting with due quorum has the authority to act as the legislative organ of the chapter. Most chapters run their meetings with parliamentary rules of order.

Supreme Council 

The Supreme Council is the chapter's only judicial body. It has authority to rule on almost any matter and its proceedings are held in camera. It is composed of the Phi and Alpha Phi and at least three elected members-at-large.

Naming 

Each chapter in Zeta Psi has a unique name composed of one or two Greek letters. Rather than being assigned a name in a strict order of alphabetization, a petitioning colony that receives a charter chooses a name for their chapter. From this point on, the name is fixed. Even if the chapter goes inactive—in that it has no undergraduate members—the name will be taken up by any group that re-establishes a chapter at that university campus.

The name can be based on many different factors. For instance, it is common for new chapters to take on an element from an existing chapter that has helped them form. Theta Xi in Toronto adopted the Xi from their neighbor chapter in Michigan, and in turn chapters in Ontario started adding "Theta" as part of their name from their relationship to the Toronto chapter. There are now many chapters in Ontario and there is no pre-requisite to have a Theta in the name. Other times, a name is related to other factors like the Roman Catholic Villanova University chapter being named Alpha Omega due to the Christian significance.

A one or two-letter name can only be re-used if the chapter possessing the name is pronounced "deceased." This has not happened since 1892.

Elder chapters 

For each undergraduate chapter at a campus, there is a corresponding elder chapter composed of alumni members.

Chapter governance 

An elder chapter has a similar organizational structure to the active chapter, with Greek-letter officers and a supreme council.

Greek-letter officers 

There are only six Greek-letter officers in the elder chapter that act as its executive.
 Phi – Φ – Elder President
 Alpha Phi – ΑΦ – Elder Vice-president
 Sigma – Σ – Elder Secretary
 Gamma – Γ – Elder Treasurer
 Delta – Δ – Elder historian
 Beta Pi – ΒΠ – Elder advisor to the active chapter

Chapter meeting 

Elder chapters are also required to hold annual chapter meetings to serve as a legislative body.

Supreme Council 

The Supreme Council is the chapter's only judicial body. It has authority to rule on almost any matter and its proceedings. It may hear appeals and rule on matters from the active supreme council. It is composed of all the elder officers and at least three elected members-at-large.

Naming 

The elder chapter has the same name as the active chapter but has different organization, powers, and is legally a separate entity.

Geographical associations 

Geographical associations are similar to elder chapters, in that they are composed of alumni and have a vote at Grand Chapter. However, they are larger in scope and have no active affiliation. Geographical associations mostly base their membership on alumni living in a metropolitan area.

Active geographical associations (as of 2006)
 Zeta Psi Washington, D.C. Elders Association
 Zeta Psi New York City Elders Association
 Philly Zete RAC
 Zeta Psi Chicago Alumni Club
 Zeta Psi Boston Alumni Club
 Zeta Psi Arizona Alumni Club
 Zeta Psi Dallas Alumni Club
 Houston Association of Zeta Psi
 Southern California Association of Zeta Psi Alumni
 Zeta Psi Alumni Association of Greater Pittsburgh
 Zeta Psi Elders Association of Durham
 Zeta Psi Elders Association of Toronto
 Zeta Psi Alumni of Cleveland
 Zeta Psi of Texas

Grand Chapter 

The Grand Chapter is composed of the seven grand officers and one voting delegate from each active and elder chapter and geographical association. The Grand Chapter has complete and total authority over Zeta Psi.

Chapter governance 

The Grand Chapter has a similar organizational structure to the active chapter, with Greek-letter officers but with an executive committee in place of a supreme council.

Greek-letter officers 

Grand Chapter has the same number and function of Greek-letter officers however, the name has an additional "alpha" to denote it as different. At one point in time, there were several appointed officers each designated Chi Phi Alpha (ΧΦΑ) of a particular area (e.g. Canada, or the Northwest United States) which served as geographical representatives to the Grand Chapter.
 Phi Alpha – ΦΑ – President and executive head
 Alpha Phi Alpha – ΑΦΑ – Vice-president
 Sigma Alpha – ΣΑ – Secretary
 Alpha Sigma Alpha – ΑΣΑ – Corresponding secretary
 Gamma Alpha – ΓΑ – Treasurer and fiscal officer
 Delta Alpha – ΔΑ – Fraternity historian
 Sigma Rho Alpha – ΣΡΑ – Sergeant-at-arms

Annual meeting of the Board of Delegates 

The Board of Delegates elects the Grand Chapter officers and may amend the by-laws and act as the legislative body of the Grand Chapter.

Executive committee 

The executive committee is constituted as follows: "Phi Alpha, Alpha Phi Alpha, Sigma Alpha, Gamma Alpha, Delta Alpha, and four (4) representatives duly elected at large from the Fraternity, with the provision that at least one member of the Committee must be from Canada and at least one must be from the United States."

Zeta Psi in popular culture
 Steve Berman, who was a member of the Beta Tau chapter at Tulane University, featured that chapter in his short story "His Mouth Will Taste of Chernobyl".

See also
 List of social fraternities and sororities

References

External links 
 
 Zeta Psi Washington, DC Elders Association's official site
 Zeta Psi members in politics
 Minnesota Association of Zeta Psi

 
Student organizations established in 1847
International student societies
North American Interfraternity Conference
1847 establishments in New York (state)